A by-election was held on 21 February 2020 for three vacant seats of the Assembly of Experts in Tehran Province, caused by death of Akbar Hashemi Rafsanjani, Nasrollah Shahabadi and Abolfazl Mirmohammadi. It was held along with the 2020 Iranian legislative election. 

In contrast to the competitive 2016 election which the moderate list had won by a landslide, it was an uncontested election without presence of such candidates and resulted in victory of all three candidates supported by The Two Societies.

The number of invalid votes cast in the election and its turnout were not officially declared by the authorities.

Results

References 

Elections in Tehran
2020s in Tehran
Unopposed by-elections in Iran